María Carolina Figueroa Molina (born May 28, 1981) better known as La Rancherita, is a Chilean singer.

Discography 
 Prueba de Fuego (2001)
 Ranxerita (2008)
 Muñeca (2011)

Filmography 
 Rojo fama contrafama (2003) – Participant/Singer
 Mekano (2006) – Participant/Singer
 Fiebre de Baile (2009) – Participant/Dancer
 Año 0 (2011) – Herself/Participant
 Fiebre de Baile 4 (2011) – Participant/Dancer
 Psíquicos (2012) – Herself (Guest)

References

External links 
 
  

1985 births
Living people
People from Quillota
21st-century Chilean women singers